The second USS Potomac was an old whaler the United States Navy purchased on 1 November 1861. She was a part of the "Stone Fleet," a group of ships used to block the entrances to Confederate harbors during the American Civil War, and was sunk for this purpose on 9 January 1862.

The sinking of the  "Stone Fleet" is memorialized in a poem of that name by Herman Melville.  By coincidence, the log book of Potomac,  kept by William Hussey Macy of Nantucket, Massachusetts, records Melville's desertion from the Fairhaven, Massachusetts whaler Achusnet in the Marquesas Islands in the entry for 4 July 1842.  Melville's experiences in the Marquesas are  the source of his novel Typee.

See also

 Union Blockade

References

 

Ships of the Union Navy
Ships of the Stone Fleet
Scuttled vessels
Maritime incidents in January 1862
Shipwrecks of the American Civil War
Shipwrecks in the Atlantic Ocean
Shipwrecks of the United States